The National State Bank Building is located on River Street in Troy, New York, United States, at its junction with Fulton and Third (southbound US 4) streets. It was listed on the National Register of Historic Places in 1970, one of the earliest buildings in the city so recognized. Since 1986 it has been a contributing property to the Central Troy Historic District.

It was built in 1904, on the site of a public market that had burned down the year before, by local architects M. F. Cummings & Son in the Beaux Arts architectural style. Five stories high, three bays wide by nine deep, its fenestration is similar to the larger Ilium Building a block to the east. The first story is faced in rusticated stone, the second through fifth in light gold brick with stone and terra cotta trim, and with carved stone panels beneath the third and fourth floor windows. These three distinct zones, along with the building's steel frame construction and use of an elevator inside, show the influence of early skyscraper design.

References

Buildings and structures in Troy, New York
National Register of Historic Places in Troy, New York
Beaux-Arts architecture in New York (state)
Commercial buildings completed in 1904
Individually listed contributing properties to historic districts on the National Register in New York (state)